Bombay: Our City (Hamara Sahar) is a 1985 Indian documentary film directed by Anand Patwardhan. The film story based on daily battle for survival of the 4 million slum dwellers of Bombay who make up half the city's population. The film produced by the Ramesh Asher & Sanjiv Shah. Anand Patwardhan graduate (B.A.) in English Literature from Bombay University in 1970, won a scholarship to get another B.A. in sociology from Brandeis University in 1972 and earned a master's degree in communications from McGill University in 1982. The film was released on 7 June 1985.

Awards
 National Film Award for Best Non-Feature Film, 1985
 Special Jury Award, Cinema du reel, France, 1986
 Filmfare Award for Best Documentary, 1986

References

Cinema Politica lists wrong credits for Bombay Our City and should not be the correct source for 
Wikipedia. I, Anand Patwardhan am the producer, director and editor of this film.

External links

Bombay: Our City in Patwardhan's website

Indian documentary films
Documentary films about cities
1985 films